The Garden Route National Park is a national park in the Garden Route region of the Western Cape and Eastern Cape provinces in South Africa. It is a coastal reserve well known for its indigenous forests, dramatic coastline, and the Otter Trail. It was established on 6 March 2009 by amalgamating the existing Tsitsikamma and Wilderness National Parks, the Knysna National Lake Area, and various other areas of state-owned land.

The Garden Route National Park (Tsitsikamma, Knysna and Wilderness Sections) has a pleasant, temperate climate; it is unique in Africa as the only area in which rainfall occurs throughout the year.

Sections

Tsitsikamma section 

The section is
known for its indigenous forests, dramatic coastline, and the Otter Trail. The main accommodation is at Storms River Mouth.

Wilderness section 

The Wilderness section is located around the seaside town of Wilderness, Western Cape between the larger towns of George, Sedgefield and Knysna, in the Western Cape. It stretches from the Touw River mouth to the Swartvlei estuary and beyond, where it links with the Goukamma Nature Reserve, giving protection to five lakes and the Serpentine, which is the winding strip of water joining Island Lake to the Touw River at the Ebb and Flow Rest Camp.  This section of the park protects three major zones of indigenous forest, four types of fynbos (wild shrubs), plus various lakes and winding waterways. There are also a number of archaeologically significant sites.

References

External links

Garden Route National Park
Proposed new Garden Route National Park

2009 establishments in South Africa
National parks of South Africa
Protected areas established in 2009
Protected areas of the Eastern Cape
Protected areas of the Western Cape